This is a list of Spook's characters. They are all fictional characters who have appeared in a Spook's-related book by Joseph Delaney.

Characters

Thomas Jason Ward

Tom is an apprentice to John Gregory, the County Spook. The Spook has had 29 apprentices before Tom, although he is the best so far. He is the seventh son of a seventh son, but it is revealed in the sixth book of the series that his mother is actually the original Lamia witch, also known as Zenobia. Early in the series he seems a fearful, the hunted, but after the sixth book he is the hunter, a real spook's apprentice.

As a seventh son of a seventh son, Tom has many gifts, including being able to see and hear ghosts and masking his "scent" from the long-sniffing of witches. Tom has also inherited gifts from his mother, such as being able to slow down and stop time and smell the presence of death. In moonlight, his shadow is abnormally long, which the Ordeen (one of the old gods) described as a signal of what he will become. His mother taught him Greek, and he is learning Latin and Old Tongue from Mr. Gregory. He is the youngest in the family and also relates with Jack Ward.

Tom has accomplished many things despite his lack of experience, such as binding a full-grown ripper boggart after only six months with the spook.

He has a friendship, strongly disapproved of by his master, with Alice, a young girl who will grow into a witch, though it is uncertain whether she will become malevolent or benign. Tom continues his friendship with Alice, despite the warnings given by the Spook. He also seems to develop some feelings for her, although it is possible that he is frets over her because she is the closest thing he ever had to a friend. In the fifth book she kisses him for the first time, before supposedly running to Pendle. In the eighth book he admits to loving Alice when the Fiend takes her away to the dark.

Not much is told about his appearance, although The Spook's Battle (Attack of the Fiend) reveals that he has green eyes and is left-handed, which is common among Spooks (Bill Arkwright, The Spook and Tom are all left-handed).
 
Tom is the hero of the Wardstone Chronicles (along with John Gregory), as he defeats most of the series' major antagonists.

In the Spook's sequel series, Tom has replaced Gregory as the new spook in Chipenden. Later he takes a young girl named Jenny as an apprentice; she is the seventh daughter of a seventh daughter. At first, Tom does not believe her, but it is later proven to be true. There has never been a female spook.

John Gregory (The Spook)

John Gregory is one of the most prolific Spooks and has a mysterious history that is discovered as the series progresses. He originally trained to be a priest, but after falling out with his brother, he became a Spook. He has medium-length grey hair that tufts at the back along with sharp, yellow teeth and a grey goatee, giving him a wolf-like appearance. Like Tom, he also has green eyes and is left handed.

Gregory is a strict mentor, always to the point and hard to please. However, he praises Tom at some moments, albeit gruffly and reluctantly, showing that he has a soft side. He claims this lack of praise is at least in effort towards doing his best to avoid Tom becoming big-headed and making mistakes.

He has had relationships with Meg Skelton (a lamia witch) and Emily Burns, and is suspected to have had more. He met Emily Burns, his brother's former lover, first. However, she became tired of him and moved on, although they remained friends.

When he had just become a Spook, Gregory met Meg. He had been going off to take care of a monster and she was captive in the tower, bound with a silver chain. She kissed him passionately after he took off the silver chain that bound her, but he discovered that she was a Lamia witch after noticing the line of yellow and green scales along her spine. When he tried to put her into a pit, he couldn't bring himself to do it. He sends Meg and her sister back to their home in Greece at the end of the third book, (The Spook's Secret).

He has a brother named Andrew, a skilled locksmith. He has made keys that can open almost any door for both the Spook and Tom, which have often come in use, such as when they were battling the creature known as the Bane in the Priestown catacombs. He is introduced in the second book.

Gregory has one other significant brother, who is a priest. He is first introduced in Horshaw after Tom has just begun his apprenticeship. Gregory and his brother do not speak because Emily Burns was once the priest's lover. However, the Spook did decide to pay his last respects and attend his brother's funeral, killed by a ripper (a powerful boggart). In "The Spook's Tale" John's brother Paul is introduced. Not much is known about him apart from the fact that he shared a nightmare with John in his childhood.

During the fifth instalment, he sends his apprentice to train with Bill Arkwright, his previous apprentice, to receive further training against the everlasting battle against the dark. Later he has to help Tom rescue Arkwright from several Water Witches. At the end of the book, he sends Alice away because, among other things, she used a mirror to communicate with other witches, including the witch assassin Grimalkin, who saves Tom's life in the fifth book.

In the tenth book, John retires and allows Tom to become the new spook of Chipenden, even though Tom has not yet finished his training.

John uses Greek symbols to mark the places of witches, boggarts, and the unquiet dead. β (beta) is used for boggarts; a line through the beta shows that the boggart is bound. (gamma) is used to mark a ghost or ghast. Roman Numerals I-X mark how strong the boggart or unquiet dead is (I is the strongest and X is the weakest); in the case of the unquiet dead, however, it shows how strong it is or if it is classified as a ghost or ghast. A ghost is a coherent spirit, left on earth for a purpose; a ghast is a fragment of a person that has gone to the afterlife and they fade over time.

Death

In the final book, the Spook's Revenge, John Gregory dies in the Battle of the Wardstone; it is not told who killed him, but it is presumed to be a witch on the opposing dark side. In his last moments before his death he stood back to back with Grimalkin and helped to kill the witches, and allowed the Fiend to be destroyed. Afterwards, he is buried by Tom Ward, along with the Starblade, as Tom says that he will never disturb his dead master, and therefore will never use the Starblade again. After his death, Tom becomes the Chipenden Spook and acquires all his belongings.

Alice Deane

Alice is an orphan with parents from different clans, or so it was thought, until eventually it comes out she is the daughter of the Fiend and Bony Lizzie. She was raised by Bony Lizzie and was the great-granddaughter of Mother Malkin. She first tricks Tom into freeing Mother Malkin but later helps him defeat her and her vengeful relatives.

Later in the series she sticks to Tom and the Spook, assisting them countless times with her magic when their principles would inhibit them. She cares a great deal about Tom, though not so much about the Spook, and considers their inhibitions with feelings varying from amusement to exasperation.

Originally from Pendle, Alice is supposedly the daughter of a Malkin mother and a Dean Father.

In the first part of the Wardstone Chronicles, Alice Deane seems to be a confused young girl seemingly under the wrong influence. However, as the series goes on, she starts to see from good and bad, and starts to help Tom in many ways. She is shown to be irritable, throwing a fit when Tom suggested that she cooks. (Although Tom later pointed out that she is good at it.) She also seems somewhat reluctant to help out Mr. Gregory when he's in a tight spot, pointing out that he probably wouldn't do the same for her, but ends up being convinced by Tom to do so anyway. She dislikes the fact that Mr. Gregory does not trust her, and is known for throwing fits when she is left out of something important.
However, Tom's mother was often worried about how Alice would turn out, as she seems to be on the fine line between good and evil. Even though she helped destroy Mother Malkin and the Bane, it was (mostly) her fault that they had to be stopped in the first place, albeit unknowingly. Bony Lizzie had made her convince Tom to give Mother Malkin blood cakes, and she had made a sacrifice to the Bane out of hatred and spite toward the Quisitor. Although she knew the consequences, she had freed the Bane to help Tom, Mr. Gregory, and herself.

Alice seems to have a gift with botany, putting leaves on Tom's hand to treat his burn. Gregory, despite his intense distrust for Alice, appreciates her work as a scribe. Tom has stated that she has nice handwriting.

During the series, Alice is said to be pretty with big, hazel eyes and long, black hair; however, her hair turned white in the eighth book when she was traumatized after spending time in the Fiends domain.

She seems to have feelings for Tom as she jokes about using, during a moment of solitude during the day of his birthday, glamor and fascination on him, two witch powers to seduce and control. Another reason for believing that Alice has feelings for Tom may come from the fifth book, where she is tormented by the idea that she will be separated from him and finally kisses him on the lips for a while. Yet another hint is when she is trying to convince Tom to use the blood jar, stating that if he did they could never separate and she was not opposed to the idea, saying she would actually rather like it. Finally, in the Spook's Blood, Tom must sacrifice the one he loves... this turns out to be Alice.

At the end of the fifth book, Alice contacts Grimalkin (a savage witch assassin) to help Tom defeat the Fiend's daughter, Morwena, which later results in her being banished from Chipenden. She revealed to Tom that she was going to become a witch once back in Pendle Hill, claiming that's where she belonged.

In the sixth book, Alice uses a blood jar to fend off the Fiend and keep him from taking Tom's soul. Tom, worried that Alice would have to face the Fiend's wrath, realizes that from now on they have to stick close together which would be a hard life as Tom would be really worried to so much as let Alice out of sight.

In the seventh installment, Alice is named by Bony Lizzie "her own gift for the County", as Mam said the same about her son Tom.

In the Spook's Destiny, she is dragged into the Fiend's Domain by The Fiend after the blood jar cracks. After the god Pan returns her as a favor to Tom after the Fiend is defeated, her hair is snow-white from the shock.

In the Spook's Revenge, she opens the Doomdryte grimoire, in order to read it to gain immense power and destroy the Fiend. However, upon opening the book, the supposedly dead Mage, Lukrasta appears and takes her away. Upon looking into his eyes in the first moment, Alice falls in love with him, and is enthralled with him, understanding that their fates are intertwined and that they are 'soul mates'. She immediately becomes a malevolent witch, finally going to the dark. She contributes to the re-attaching of the Fiend's head and body, as according to her, the Fiend would not allow the newborn God Talkus to rise and take over the world, and would fight with the humans. (We can guess from what we learn later on, that she hopes Tom will kill the Fiend because if he does not then he will be killed himself) However, Tom continues despite this and destroys the Fiend. Afterwards, she gives Lukrasta her power, in order for them to combat the rising Kobalos God, Talkus, who has been born and is going to rise in power and exterminate the men of the world in the future. Tom tells Alice to never come to see him in Chipenden ever again in their final meeting of the book, and that he shall put her in a pit. She claims to know that they shall meet again in the future, but that he will not put her in a pit. Upon that note, they separate on their own paths, with Tom loving Alice but she not loving him. (or so he thought)

In the Second book of the Spook's brand-new sequel series, Alice and Tom meet again after Lukrasta's death while attempting to defeat the Kobalos. She tells him that she was forced to be with Lukrasta by the old god Pan and that she loved Tom when they lived with John Gregory, that she loved him when she was with Lukrasta And that she loves him now. Although Alice is a witch that is certain to be separated from Tom for all of eternity after death, they stay together, along with Tom's new apprentice Jenny. She then goes off to Pendle to try to unite the Pendle clans against the Kobalos and finds out that Lukrasta was not dead and that Pan has a plan to kill the Kobalos god, Talkus the unborn. She takes Tom with her to his tower in Cymru. After Talkus is destroyed Lukrasta orders Alice to kill Tom and deprive him of his weapon, the Starblade which protects him from any Dark magic. She convinces Tom that she'll kill Lukrasta with it. When Lukrasta appears she pretends to kill Tom but at the very last moment she steps aside and kills Lukrasta instead showing that she wanted to be with Tom; now that Talkus is dead Lukrasta is no longer needed and she does not fear Pan because his goal has been achieved. They have a baby daughter named Tilda in the next series: 'Brother Wulf'.

Mam (Lamia/Zenobia)

Also known as Lamia and Zenobia in The Spook's Blood, she is the first witch of her kind. Allegedly, she was a wife to the Old God Zeus and had children with him. The jealous goddess Hera soon found out, having Lamia's hand nailed to a rock, sentencing her to be killed by exposure to the sun. She was saved by Tom's father and, after refusing another chance to return to the Dark by killing him, she gave up her immortality, married him and moved with him back to the County. She bought the farm so he could give up sailing and she had only seven sons with him. When Tom was born at last she started grooming him to become the next Spook.

Lamia/Zenobia also had several special abilities, as she never really was a normal human being.
She had the ability to manipulate time for any being close to her: she could slow time or completely stop it. Just like The Fiend, this gift was passed on to Tom.
She could also smell whether a person was close to death. She also passed this ability onto Tom.

She leaves the farm for Greece after her husband's death and bequeaths Tom her three coffers which held her money, books and potions and her two wild lamia 'sisters'. They helped drive the Mouldheels out of the Malkin Tower during the events of The Spook's Battle. Later, during The Spook's Sacrifice she asked Tom for her money to buy a boat and hire a crew. She sets for Greece, bound to confront her archenemy Ordeen. She holds Ordeen in her lamia form while the Ord falls back into the darkness, effectively killing herself.

She was a proud woman and an extraordinary midwife, having saved more than a dozen women in the County. She can allegedly see into the future and her letters seem to be further proof of that, although the Spook grudgingly explains them by good intuition and intellect, and she has helped Tom with advice whenever she could.

Bill Arkwright

A spook in operation in Caster, Bill Arkwright was one of The Spook's few apprentices to survive. He was in charge of training Tom in battle in the book: The Spook's Mistake. Bill has an alcohol problem, which he called 'demon drink'. Bill Arkwright was the Spook for the other side of the County who makes his first appearance in The Spook's Mistake. Tom was sent to him so that Tom could learn the physical side of being a Spook's apprentice and learn things that John Gregory could not teach him anymore. Bill was a drunkard and couldn't control the urge to drink, mainly because his parents could not be sent to the light and remained in the world in the form of spirits. It is later found out that The Fiend had bound them to the Earth. Arkwright's ways of teaching seem hard and aggressive, but they soon come in handy, especially when Tom comes to save him after he is captured by Morwena, a water witch. One of his dogs, Tooth, is killed by her, and his other dog, Claw, has two pups: Blood and Bone. He is the Spook of the North, and later on with the help of Tom and Grimalkin, Bill manages to set his parents free. After that his mood improves and he became a happier man. He lived in a mill surrounded by a moat full of salt to keep enemies from the dark away. He reappears in the book: The Spook's Sacrifice. In this he travels with Thomas Ward, Alice Deane, John Gregory, Mam (Lamia), and many witches to Greece, to face the Old God, the Ordeen. He joins Thomas, Alice and Mr. Gregory in the Ord, the Ordeen's home, and helps their efforts to find the Ordeen. Once the Ordeen is dying, they try to escape the Ord, and he stays back to stop fire elementals from harming them, sacrificing himself for them to escape. He also features briefly, and is mentioned in The Spook's Nightmare, as a ghost trapped in Limbo by Bony Lizzie, used to save Thomas Ward's life, by stopping his dogs- Claw, Blood and Bone, from killing Thomas under the power of the shaman, Lord Barrule. He is later freed into the 'light' due to Bony Lizzie's death.
Tooth is a grey with black lines wolfhound
Claw is a black wolfhound bitch and Tooth's mate
Blood and Bone are their pups

Judd Brinscall

Judd Brinscall trained as a Spook's Apprentice under John Gregory. He then moved to Romania, learning from the spooks of the country, and finally moved back to the County, where he found his ex-Master, and his new apprentice, Tom Ward. He is first featured in the book The Spooks: Blood. Brinscall took part in the Battle of the Wardstone.

He ends up in the Caster Watermill, which once belonged to Bill Arkwright, and still has ties with Tom Ward.

The Ward family

John Ward

Originally a sailor, John Ward married Tom's mother, whom he met in Greece, bought a farm with her money and settled down. He dies during the events of The Spook's Secret. Before his death, he tells the story to his son about how he met Mam, Thomas' mother. He was a sailor on the coast of Greece and saw Mam, naked, nailed by her hand to a rock and bound to a silver chain, to die when the sun came up and shine on her body. However, he freed her and protected her. After staying in her home (unaware of her being Lamia for his whole life), they came to the County to settle down in a farm, and had seven sons. He did not know that at first, Mam was marrying him to have a seventh son (when she learnt he himself was a seventh son she wanted to produce a spook, who would also inherit her own powers as Lamia), but later grew to love him, hence she was devastated at his death. John Ward was an kind, honourable man who never tricked people, and kept to his word.

Jack Ward

The eldest of the seven Ward brothers, Jack is initially jovial and patronizing towards Tom. He later reveals an underlying jealousy when he bitterly tells Tom that Tom had always been their mother's favourite. That animosity increases at each brush with the peculiarity or even danger that Tom's job entails. He goes into shock when the Malkin witches abduct him. He has black hair, with blue and bushy eyebrows that nearly meet in the middle.

Ellie Ward

Ellie Ward is Jack Ward's wife who at the end of the Spook's Apprentice has a baby girl also called Mary. She is captured and beaten in the Spooks Battle, the Pendle witches take her and her baby in the High Towers and beat them. This affects the relationship between her and Tom, distressing her. Ellie supports Tom still and is thankful.

Mary Ward

The daughter of Jack and Ellie, she is born near the ending of The Spook's Apprentice.

James Ward

Initially a blacksmith, he moves in with Jack at the farm after the events in The Spook's Battle as their Mam had requested he do so when the dark began rising in power. He earns a living initially as a blacksmith, and later by brewing ale. He is nicer to Tom than Jack is to him. He was thought to be killed by the Fiend's servants in The Spook's Blood. It is later revealed that he survived. In the Spooks Revenge Tom asked him to fight in the final battle against the Fiend, and James survives the battle. Tom returns home a few days later to find Grimalkin in his yard. She confirms James survived and made it home.

The Gregory family

Paul Gregory

When he was young he had the same dreams as The Spooks; the dream of being dragged down into the cellar by a man.

Father Gregory

The Spooks brother:- He was a priest until in the second book 'The Spooks Curse' he was killed by a ripper which Tom then bound. The brothers had not spoken with each other in over forty years because the spook had fallen in love with the woman he was to marry, Emily Burns.

Andrew

Initially a locksmith in Priestown, he moves after the events in The Spook's Curse. 
Andrew is reliable to his brother - The Spook, helping him in different situations. He tends to be courageous when Tom's alone fighting the Bane and comes to rescue his brother from Meg Skelton, a lamia.

Humans

Father Cairns

Father Cairns is John Gregory's cousin and a priest in Priestown. He tries to sway Tom with sanctimonious speeches about God and duty while sending soldiers to arrest his master. He, like most of the Church, is prejudiced against Spooks as he believes that at the end of their apprenticeship they sell their souls for their powers and they only fight small-fry, but all these are supposed to be influences of the Bane - because Father Cairns was actually a friend in need to the Spook.

The Quisitor

A cruel man who often cherishes to burn things, and seizes belongings from the poor, or the falsely accused witches, then burns them alive. He is a noble, shown from his clothes and his behaviour, but his wealth comes from ordinary people killed just to take their goods.

Morgan Hurst

Hurst is the seventh son of Emily Burns and a carpenter Edward Furner, another seventh son. He was a seventh son of a seventh son of a seventh son. This made him believe that he's superior to Spooks. He was adopted by the Hursts and fell in love with their daughter, Eveline. Claiming this was a forbidden love, they beat him, and he left. Eveline later drowned herself. Morgan had an interest in the dark, and was soon apprenticed to the Spook. He believed himself to be the Spook's son and became cocky and ambitious leading him to part ways with his master and study necromancy.

His ambition drove him to try to summon the old god, Golgoth. He blackmailed Tom to steal an old grimoire from his master in order to complete the necessary ritual. Golgoth was brought into the world, but killed Morgan in the process due to the Spook's changing of the ritual. Morgan couldn't spot the error, as his knowledge of the Ancient Language was poor.

Irish Mages

Also known as goat mages, they worship the old god Pan and sacrifice goats and people to bind him to the body of a he-goat and share the madness he feels.

Witches

Witches are some of the most powerful physical-being forces that have been known to serve the Dark. As well as power they have the advantage of numbers. Many of them reside in Pendle and belong to at least one of the three clans: the Malkins, the Deanes and the Mouldheels. Romania and Greece also host a great number of witches. Based on their actions, they can be:
Benign - witches who use their power to help other people
Malevolent - witches who use blood, bone, or familiar magic for evil.
Unaware - witches who don't know what they are
Falsely Accused - Women who are unjustly accused of being witches and consequently put to death.

The Malkin Clan

While the coven lives at the Malkin Tower, the rest of the clan lives in the Goldshaw Booth village.

Anne Malkin – leader of the Malkin clan.
Bony Lizzie – Bony Lizzie is Alice's "aunt" (later discovered to be her mother) and Mother Malkin's granddaughter. She's a dangerous witch practicing bone magic, hence the nickname 'Bony'. She trained Alice in witchcraft for 2 years. She was caught by the Spook at the end of The Spook's Apprentice but escaped in The Spook's Nightmare after reaching her 40th birthday.

In the film adaption, played by Antje Traue, Bony Lizzie is Alice's mother and sister to Mother Malkin. She instructs Alice to spy on the Spook and Tom and assists Malkin in wreaking havoc upon the city. At the end of the film she fights Mother Malkin because the latter threatens to harm Lizzie's daughter. She ends up being killed by Malkin, but manages to wound her grievously in return.

Mother Malkin – A malevolent witch who is the main antagonist of "The Spook's Apprentice". She is able to use blood magic and has committed several acts of murder, like pretending to be a boarder for expectant mothers so she can kill them and their babies in order to use their blood.

When Gregory learned of this, he bound Mother Malkin and placed her into a pit, where she became an old hag as her powers seeped away into the earth. Years later, Bony Lizzie has Alice use Tom by sneaking Mother Malkin cakes filled with suet, bits of meat, and Alice's blood. She was able to escape, but Tom fought her and killed her by striking her with a rowan staff while she was in running water. She came back, possessing the butcher towards the end of the book, in order to be reborn as Tom's niece. Tom throws salt and iron at her, and she slowly begins shrinking and turning into goo. She is then eaten by the hairy pigs on the farm.

In the film adaption, played by Julianne Moore, Mother Malkin's story of being imprisoned is changed. Here she is the former love of Gregory and originally a good witch. In response to the humans' hatred for her kind and her own fears she embraced the Dark and even murdered Gregory's wife out of envy. Mother Malkin is freed at the start of the blood moon, and attempts to recruit her followers while seeking revenge on Gregory and the humankind. In the end she is grievously wounded by Bony Lizzie and killed and burned by Tom.

Grimalkin – The 33-year-old assassin of the Malkin witch clan, she is a malevolent witch skilled with knives and scissors in combat. Her mark is a pair of scissors. She nonetheless follows a strict code of honour not to use trickery in combat, to the point where, when ordered to kill Tom, she regretted it as she would not be able to face him when he was at his prime, and offered him a quick death (although he did survive).

She gained protection from the Fiend by bearing him a son. The baby was not a witch but an ordinary boy so the Fiend killed him. As a result of this, she vows to destroy him. For that reason she's unlike the average antagonist as her hatred often makes her side with Tom.

Grimalkin is the best character in physical limits and has battle smarts. She is the best Malkin Clan assassin. Grimalkin soon dies in the Starblade chronicles and is reborn in a different undescribed world of the dead. Although most of the witches and people are used as food for new creatures that will hopefully be described in a new series or book.

Needle- A Malkin Clan assassin known for killing her victims with a long spear.
Thorne- An apprentice of Grimalkin who has the potential to suppress her mentor as a witch assassin. She is later killed by the Fiend's servants while trying to retrieve the Fiend's head. In the Dark/Hell, Thorne later attempts to revive herself by betraying Alice (who was sent there by the Fiend), but she later regrets her decision and helps Alice escape.
Kernolde- A Malkin Clan assassin known to form alliances with dead witches who kept her in her position for so long. She dug traps in the Witch Dell which Grimalkin fell into when she went to duel Kernolde. She is later killed by Grimalkin.
Maggie – Maggie Malkin was hanged at Caster three years before the events in The Spook's Battle and the clan left her at Witch Dell. She has bulging eyes and a longer than usual neck, with her head twisted to the left. She's dressed in a long dark gown covered in patches of mold.
Tibb – A kretch (as outlined by Grimalkin) made to balance Mab's power. Created the past Halloween before the events in The Spook's Battle by the Malkin and Deane clans. He's a powerful scryer, small yet stronger than a grown man. The Spook kills him at Norwell's residence after he shares Wurmalde's plans for Lammas.
Radu - The leader of the Malkin Clan's assassins who is a movie exclusive character. Radu is played by Djimon Hounsou.

The Deane Clan

The Deanes live in the Roughlee village of Pendle.

Florence Deane – leader of the Deane Clan.
Agnes Sowwerbutts – Alice's supposed aunt. A benign witch who lives on the outskirts of Pendle. She is a powerful scryer.

In I Am Grimalkin, she is tortured and killed by Grimalkin's pursuers in retaliation for healing Grimalkin's poisoning.

The Mouldheel Clan

The Mouldheel Clan practices blood and bone magic and takes pride in its members' scrying skills. Because of them, people in Pendle either have no mirrors in the house or turn them to face the wall. The Mouldheels live in the Bareleigh village.

Mab Mouldheel - Leader of her clan, Mab is the most talented with foresight. She is in love with Tom Ward but he hates her because she's a witch and once she was about to kill his niece, Mary.

She has green eyes and long blond hair. She dresses in a washed-out blue dress with ragged sleeves. She does not wear shoes, unlike most witches.

She has two younger twin sisters, Beth and Jennet.

The Greek Witches

Meg Skelton - A domesticated Lamia witch whose physical characteristics are that she has silver hair, high cheek bones and looks like a young woman even though she is old. Meg used to have a relationship with the spook John Gregory.
Marcia Skelton - Meg's sister, a feral lamia witch who was locked under the Spook's winter home. She traveled back with Meg back to their home land of Greece at the end of 'The Spook's Secret'.
Wurmalde - She's described by Tom as in her late thirties, tall for a woman, with abundant dark hair like a lion's mane. She has bold and piercing eyes and lips so pale that they resembled those of a corpse which contrast with her obvious strength and vitality. She carries herself proudly which makes people say she's above herself. She happens to be one of Tom's mother's most bitter enemies and plans to set the Fiend to kill Tom. One of the lamia witches in Tom's trunks grabs her as she flees after finishing the ritual and drops her onto Gore Rock, effectively killing her.

Water Witches

Water witches hunt usually by burying themselves in mud or the marshes and waiting for their victims. They can hold their breath for hours and unlike normal witches, they can cross running or stagnant water. They have a nail curled around like a hook which they use to spear the ear or the cheek of the victim.

Morwena - A water witch, she is a daughter of the Fiend and thus more powerful than other water witches. She practices blood magic and can't stand on dry land for more than an hour. She has dark hair down to her shoulders. Around her shoulders she has smock covered in green scum, while on the lower half of her body she wears a ragged skirt caked with brown marsh slime. She has two rows of yellow-green teeth with four immense fangs instead of normal canines. Her left eye is normally closed, the right one open – a vertical slit like the cold eye of a snake or lizard – and her nose is a beak of sharp bone without any covering of flesh or even skin. Her hands look human but for her fingernails, which are sharp, curved talons. Her toes were webbed and ending in a sharp talon. She opens her left eye by touching it with her fingers to release the seal on it. That eye is completely red as if completely filled with blood and the person looking at the eye becomes paralyzed. The eye is mostly closed because it uses a lot of energy and she can only use it on one person at a time.

Demons

The Fiend

The Fiend is the most powerful of the Old Gods, and is the Dark made Flesh and the Wardstone Chronicles' primary antagonist. He is also known as Old Nick, The Devil, Satan, and the Father of lies. He has control over time, and he can change his shape at will. He claims to be Alice Deane's father, this is later proven true by Tom Ward's Mam. There are a few ways to keep the Fiend from approaching, one way is to bear him a child, (witches do this often) and the other is to have a blood jar, which contains one of the Fiend's child's blood, and the wearer's blood.

In the Spook's Destiny, he is bound by Tom, the Spook and Grimalkin. He is finally killed in the last book when Tom cuts with the hero blades. He stabs his right hand with the Dolorous, his left with the Bone Cutter and he severs his head with the Destiny Blade. His body is cut and fed to the Kobalos god, Talkus, who has replaced him as the most powerful old god.

The Old Gods

Golgoth

Also known as the Lord Of Winter and the God of Ice, he is awoken by Morgan through the wrong ritual. He tries to coerce Tom into freeing him from the pentagram but Tom refuses and Golgoth runs out of power before he can kill Tom.

Morrigan

The Morrigan is the Celtic goddess of magic. She often appears with a raven's head and a female body. She is the main antagonist of "The Spook's Destiny". Although she is not slain by Tom, she is wounded by him, her head cut off.

Ordeen

An elemental goddess of fire, and the clear opposite to Golgoth. Her true form is a salamander, the most powerful form of a fire elemental. She is extremely hard to kill, with a degree of immunity to silver. Also, unlike other Old Gods and the Fiend, she does not need help from humans to get from the dark to Earth. Tom suggests something perhaps was done in the past to help her. Possibly it has to do with the fact that she is part witch and part fire goddess, as she shows both forms.

She has many followers. The Maenads worship her on Earth, but many more followers come through the portal with the Ordeen. These include: the vaengir, demons, fire elementals, and dark warriors. The Fiend mentions that there are others that wake right before the Ordeen. Probably servants that are almost as powerful as the Ordeen herself. Her portal is a pillar of fire, which causes birds and animals to flee the area.

She was killed by Tom's mother (Lamia) during the events in The Spook's Sacrifice. She is the mortal enemy of Lamia, for unknown reasons.

Pan

He is worshipped by the Irish mages who bind him through dark magic to the body of a goat to share in the madness that grabs him.

To Tom he appears as a young boy with long hair, pale face and pointy, slightly elongated ears and toenails so long that they curl into a spiral. He's a very talented musician. Tom does him a favor in The Spook's Destiny by helping Pan "commit suicide" (killing the goat he was bound to) to escape the mages' ritual. Pan returns the favor by returning Alice from the Fiend's realm when Tom defeats him and the barriers between his and Pan's realms weaken.

Zeus

The leader of the old gods and husband of Hera. Also lover of Lamia, Tom Ward's mother. Had children with Lamia, but all but one were slaughtered by Hera out of jealousy.

Hera

Jealous wife of Zeus (leader of the Old Gods). Slaughtered all but one of the infants Lamia (Tom's Mam) bore to Zeus.

Siscoi

Siscoi is the Romanian vampire old god, also known as the "God of Blood". He appeared as a main antagonist of "The Spook's Blood". He was destroyed by Tom Ward after sucking Tom's blood, which was poisonous to him.

Beasts

Boggart

There are many kinds of Boggarts. They can all travel along special kinds of faults, that instead of being faults in the Earth, but faults in spiritual magic. They can travel along these instantly, as if they were teleporting.

Hairy Boggart

Hairy boggarts take the shape of animals. They are mostly dogs, but there are still many cats, a goat or two and sometimes a horse.
The boggart which guards Mr. Gregory's Chipenden house is called Kratch and returns to the house after Tom locates and makes a new deal with it. its mostly invisible but when happy (or angry) takes the form of a large ginger cat with one eye. It lost the other eye in battle with the Bane.

Hall Knocker

A Hall Knocker is a boggart who announces his or her existence by knocking. It can develop in a Stone Chucker, and the Spook fought one twice, coming very close to death.

Ripper

A "Ripper" is the most dangerous and deadly of all Boggarts. It starts out by killing cows and sucking their blood (hence the name "Cattle Ripper"). However, if they taste human blood, they'll switch from cattle to humans. To hunt humans, they open a fissure in the ground and trap one of the human's limbs in it, usually a leg. They then rip open the limb and viciously suck the blood from it. This process can take anywhere from 5 minutes, to 10 hours, depending on its size. In one of the books, Tom had to bind a "Ripper" in Horshaw that was sucking the blood out of the leg of a priest (who was, in fact, the Spook's brother) who had tried to ward it off by praying. This happened in a church.

Demon

Buggane

The buggane is a category of demon that frequents ruins and usually materialises as a black bull or a hairy man, although other forms are chosen if they suit its purpose. In marshy ground bugganes have been known to shape-shift into wormes.

The buggane makes two distinctive sounds – either bellowing like an enraged bull to warn off those who venture near its domain or whispering to its victims in a sinister human voice. It can speak to the mind of its prey and those who hear it die in a few days unless the buggane is killed.

Bugganes are immune to salt and iron, which makes them hard both to kill and to confine. The only thing they are vulnerable to is a blade made from silver alloy, which must be driven into the heart of the buggane when it has fully materialized. The Spook and Tom meet bugganes on the isle of Mona during the events in The Spook's Nightmare.

Elementals

Fire elementals

A Jellyfish like object that clings to ceilings, on fire and able to take flight one touch would burst a person into flames immediately, in The Spooks: Sacrifice, a Jellyfish most likely killed Bill Arkwright

Salamander

A salamander is the most powerful known fire elemental, being so hot that is can reduce the victim to ashes instantly with ease. The Ordeen, who appears near the end of the sixth book, can take the form of a salamander, similar to the Bane's ability to become a Gargoyle. The Ordeen is currently the only known Salamander.

Asteri 

An Asteri is a star-shaped elemental that hangs on ceilings and falls on its victim's head, some of them waiting to fall on the Spook and his apprentice on their `trip` in the Ord - but they're not the only ones to encounter these fire elementals, the witches from Pendle are burnt to death by them.

Water elementals

Hydra

At the near end of "The Spook's Nightmare", the Buggane transforms into a Hydra. It is a nine-headed snake that keeps its body submerged in water while its nine heads attack for it. It can only be killed by a thrust through the heart with a silver blade.

Skelt
"It's very rare and lives in crevices, either submerged or close to water. Instead of a flexible tongue, a long hollow bony tube protrudes from its mouth. The tube's sharp and pointed at the end so the creature can suck up the blood of its victims." The Kobalos god, Talkus, is known as the Skelt God.

Selkie

A selkie or a seal-woman is a shape-shifter who turns into a woman to marry a fisherman. They can't have children and they don't appear to age. They take one or two days to take human shape but can revert from it in seconds if threatened.

Sirens

They are creatures of the sea, females, who used their strange, melodious cries to lure sailors onto the rocks and destroy their
vessels. They then drag the drowning sailors into the depths and feed upon their flesh at leisure. Unlike ordinary men, spooks have a degree of resilience to their cries.

They appear as beautiful women with bright eyes, golden hair and skin, their allure very powerful, but that's an illusion they create. In reality, although they retain the body of a woman they have long and green hair like tangled seaweed, and their faces are monstrous, with huge fangs sprouting from grotesquely swollen lips.
The Spook, Bill Arkwright and Tom met them when they were sailing to Greece to fight Ordeen.
Trying to avoid them, the seventh sons of the seventh sons to get paralysed by their cries, but the sailors are hypnotized and they nearly crash.

Wight

Wights are creatures who are created and used by witches, most often as a guardian of a secret place. The witches use dark magic to create a wight and bind a drowned sailors soul to the body, causing the body to stop decaying. Instead the body get bloated and strong. The Wights don't have eyes, since these have been eaten by fish, but they have a keen hearing helping them to locate their victims while they are under water.

The wight pull its victim into the water, where the victim drowns while the wight dismember the victim.
They can be defeated with the same things that are used against witches: rowan staff, silver chain, and iron and salt

Worme

Not to be confused by "Worm". They are creatures who are water dwellers. They vary in size and looks and can be any size from that of a small dog to the size of a house. They can have legs, and most of them have tails. Their bodies are eel-like and covered in hard scales which are hard to penetrate with blades. Their mouth has deadly fangs that can bite off a limb with ease and, when on land, they can spit out a deadly poison.
Some of the wormes have wings and are sometimes mistaken for dragons because of the steam that often erupts from their mouth

Spirits

Ghast

A ghast is a fragment that's left behind when someone's soul has moved on. They are repetitive. Examples of ghasts are the spirits on Hangman's Hill and the ones in the house in Horshaw.

Ghost

Unlike a ghast, a ghost is a spirit that stays behind after the body's death. Unlike ghasts they can be reasoned with and convinced to move on.

Banshee

Is a female water spirit that predicts and warn of death. They are mostly invisible, and the only thing one can hear are their wailing cry, which is repeated 3 times per night - on the 3. day it's said that someone in a house close by, are going to die. It happens that if they are seen washing a burial shroud and if there is blood on it, the upcoming death is going to be violent.

The banshee witches can be confused by the Celtic witches, who're known to copy this act to bring death to their victim instead of foreseeing it.

Jibber

They are the souls of people who'd committed suicide and have been bound by dark magic to the area of their death. The Spook and Tom encountered them in Ireland and this far, the only way they have found to set them free is by having Alice use the spell Avaunt(to go), much to the Spook's disgruntlement.

References

Lists of literary characters